The 2023 Formula Pro USA Western FR Series will be the fourth season of the Formula Regional-level championship that run under an F3 moniker before 2020. The championship is promoted and organized by Exclusive Racing and Exclusive Auctions, and run under the same sporting regulations as the FIA-sanctioned Formula Regional Americas Championship.

Teams and drivers 
All drivers will compete with Honda-powered Ligier JS-F3 cars on Avon tires.

Race calendar 
The 2023 calendar will consist of six rounds, with two races per round. Compared to 2022, Buttonwillow Raceway Park will join the schedule, replacing one of the three rounds at Thunderhill Raceway Park.

Championship standings 
Points are awarded as follows:

See also 

 2023 Formula Pro USA FR Winter Series

References

External links 

 Official website: 

Formula Pro USA Winter Series
Formula Pro USA Winter Series
Formula Pro USA Winter Series